Textures were a Dutch progressive metalcore band, formed in 2001. Textures' lineup revolved around founding members Jochem Jacobs, Stef Broks, Bart Hennephof, and bassist Remko Tielemans who joined in 2007. Since 2010, vocalist Daniël de Jongh and keyboardist Uri Dijk have been with the band.

Textures first came to the spotlight with their debut album Polars with Listenable Records which won an Essent Award for "Most Promising Act" in 2004. Since then, the band released 2 more albums with Listenable Records, 2006's Drawing Circles and 2008's Silhouettes after signing to Nuclear Blast records.

History

Formation and Polars (2001–2003) 
In 2001, Jochem Jacobs, guitarist Bart Hennephof, drummer Stef Broks, bassist Dennis Aarts and keyboard player Richard Rietdijk formed the band and were joined by vocalist Pieter Verpaalen for their debut album Polars with Listenable Records. The album was fully self produced, with the mixing and recording done by Jacobs and Rietdijk and the artwork done by Hennephof.

Textures was named by Stef Broks after a song from the Cynic album Focus as an indicator of the use of many layers of sounds in their songs, the blending of different musical backgrounds and tastes, as well as the varying personalities of the band members.

Drawing Circles and Silhouettes (2004–2008) 

Vocalist Verpaalen was replaced by Eric Kalsbeek for their second album  Drawing Circles, released on 17 October 2006. The song "Millstone" from the album was also made into a music video. In support of the album, Textures toured with bands such as  The Ocean, Gojira and Arch Enemy and culminated in a Europe wide tour with All That Remains and Misery Signals plus nominations in three categories of Holland's Live XS Awards.

2007 saw the introduction of bassist Remko Tielemans, with whom the band recorded their 2008 release, Silhouettes which entered the Dutch charts at position no. 100, the band's first chart showing ever.

The album also featured the hit "Awake", which was made into a music video. The video was shot at the beginning of October in the Belgian Ardennes under supervision of director Rob Hodselmans and producer David Leite with assistance from the Dutch Government.

The vinyl version of Silhouettes was released in November 2008 through Garden of Exile Records. The LP was limited to 500 copies and pressed on 180-gram vinyl. The artwork was printed on extra-thick cardboard gatefold jacket with golden foil print.

The band played their first ever show in India, co-headlining the Deccan Rock Festival in Bangalore on 5 December 2009 along with Amon Amarth. The band returned to India in October 2010, performing in New Delhi at the annual festival of Indian Institute of Technology Delhi, Rendezvous 2010.

Lineup changes and Dualism (2009-2011)

After 6 years, singer/frontman Eric Kalsbeek announced his departure from the band citing the lack of personal time and ability to continue with the band. In March 2010, Daniël de Jongh (formerly of Cilice) joined the band as a replacement. Due to the singer change, the follow-up to their 2008 release Silhouettes was postponed to early 2011.

Soon after Daniel de Jongh was announced as the replacement, keyboard player Richard Rietdijk left the band. He was replaced by Uri Dijk, originally as a live stand-in and finally as a permanent member in September 2010.

On 27 January 2011, the band announced on their official website they entered the studio to begin the recording of their fourth studio album, with the following statement:

Guitarist and producer Jacobs described the progress in the album recording as:

In March 2011 the band released their first podcast covering the band's return to the studio for recording their fourth album. The new album was recorded in the Split Second Sound studio in Amsterdam, Netherlands. Jacobs and Broks stated that the new album was scheduled for release in Fall 2011 with Nuclear Blast Records. In May 2011 the band confirmed their first European Launch show at the Euroblast Festival in Köln, Germany in October alongside Chimp Spanner.

On 11 May 2011, guitarist Jacobs was adjudged the best Dutch guitarist in the Duiveltjes awards at the Gala van de Pop Muziek 2011 organized by Muziek Centrum Nederland, beating out Anne Soldaat and Vedran Mircetic.

On 14 July 2011 it was announced that the successor to Silhouettes would be titled Dualism. The artwork and track listing were unveiled on Textures official Facebook page and it was released on 23 September in Europe, South America and Asia, while North America had a 27 September release date through Nuclear Blast records.

The first single from the album "Reaching Home" was released alongside a music video.

In September 2011, Textures embarked on the Frak The Gods Tour, along with Periphery, The Contortionist and The Human Abstract in support of their album Dualism. This was Textures' first tour of the United States and Canada.

Jacobs's departure, Phenotype and break-up (2012-2017)

In January 2013, Jochem Jacobs announced he was leaving the band, but would remain writing and producing with the band.  He was replaced by Joe Tal on 20 March.

In February 2016, Textures released their fifth album, Phenotype. It was recorded at the same time as another album, Genotype, which was set to be released in 2017, and both could be considered the parts of a double album due to a similar concept. Unfortunately, in May 2017, the band also announced they would be splitting up after a farewell tour held in autumn, and the Genotype album would never be released. The band performed their final shows on 2 December 2017 in their hometown of Tilburg, and on 8 December 2017 in Pune, India where they had performed in 2013 with a line up of three guitarists.

Discography 
 Polars (2003)
 Drawing Circles (2006)
 Silhouettes (2008)
 Dualism (2011)
 Phenotype (2016)

Singles/music videos 
 "Ostensibly Impregnable" (2004)
 "Millstone" (2006)
 "Awake" (2008)
 "Reaching Home" (2011)
 "New Horizons" (2015)
 "Shaping a Single Grain of Sand" (2016)

Band members 

Final lineup
 Daniël de Jongh − lead vocals 
 Bart Hennephof − guitars, backing vocals 
 Joe Tal − guitar 
 Remko Tielemans − bass guitar 
 Uri Dijk − keyboards 
 Stef Broks − drums 

Former members
 Rom de Leeuw − lead vocals 
 Pieter Verpaalen − lead vocals 
 Eric Kalsbeek − lead vocals 
 Jochem Jacobs − guitars, backing vocals 
 Dennis Aarts − bass guitar 
 Richard Rietdijk − keyboards

Timeline

References

External links 
 Official website

Dutch heavy metal musical groups
Dutch progressive metal musical groups
Musical groups established in 2001
Nuclear Blast artists
Listenable Records artists